San Giovanni, the Italian form of "Saint John", is a name that may refer to dozens of saints. It may also refer to several places (most of them in Italy) and religious buildings:

Places

France
San-Giovanni-di-Moriani, a municipality of the Haute-Corse department, Corsica

Italy
Municipalities
Borgo San Giovanni, in the Province of Lodi, Lombardy
Castel San Giovanni, in the Province of Piacenza, Emilia-Romagna
Fornovo San Giovanni, in the Province of Bergamo, Lombardy
Luserna San Giovanni, in the Province of Turin, Piedmont
Monte San Giovanni Campano, in the Province of Frosinone, Lazio
Monte San Giovanni in Sabina, in the Province of Rieti, Lazio
Motta San Giovanni, in the Province of Reggio Calabria, Calabria
Penna San Giovanni, in the Province of Macerata, Marche
Rocca San Giovanni, in the Province of Chieti, Abruzzo
Sale San Giovanni, in the Province of Cuneo, Piedmont
San Giovanni a Piro, in the Province of Salerno, Campania
San Giovanni al Natisone, in the Province of Udine, Friuli-Venezia Giulia
San Giovanni Bianco, in the Province of Bergamo, Lombardy
San Giovanni del Dosso, in the Province of Mantua, Lombardy
San Giovanni di Gerace, in the Province of Reggio Calabria, Calabria
San Giovanni Gemini, in the Province of Agrigento, Sicily
San Giovanni Ilarione, in the Province of Verona, Veneto
San Giovanni Incarico, in the Province of Frosinone, Lazio
San Giovanni in Croce, in the Province of Cremona, Lombardy
San Giovanni in Fiore, in the Province of Cosenza, Calabria
San Giovanni in Galdo, in the Province of Campobasso, Molise
San Giovanni in Marignano, in the Province of Rimini, Emilia-Romagna
San Giovanni in Persiceto, in the Province of Bologna, Emilia-Romagna
San Giovanni la Punta, in the Province of Catania, Sicily
San Giovanni Lipioni, in the Province of Chieti, Abruzzo
San Giovanni Lupatoto, in the Province of Verona, Veneto
San Giovanni Rotondo, in the Province of Foggia, Apulia
San Giovanni Suergiu, in the Province of Carbonia-Iglesias, Sardinia
San Giovanni Teatino, in the Province of Chieti, Abruzzo
San Giovanni Valdarno, in the Province of Arezzo, Tuscany
Sesto San Giovanni, in the Province of Milan, Lombardy
Villa San Giovanni, in the Province of Reggio Calabria, Calabria
Villa San Giovanni in Tuscia, in the Province of Viterbo, Lazio

Hamlets and quarters
San Giovanni, in the municipality of Bellagio (CO), Lombardy
San Giovanni, in the municipality of Castellamonte (TO), Piedmont
San Giovanni, in the municipality of Motta di Livenza (TV), Veneto
San Giovanni, in the municipality of Portoferraio (LI), Tuscany
San Giovanni, in the municipality of Sassari, Sardinia
San Giovanni, in the municipality Solagna (VI), Veneto
San Giovanni Apostolo, a quarter of the city of Palermo
San Giovanni a Cerreto, in the municipality of Castelnuovo Berardenga (SI), Tuscany
San Giovanni a Teduccio, a quarter of the city of Naples
San Giovanni Cilento, in the municipality of Stella Cilento (SA), Campania
San Giovanni d'Asso, in the municipality of Montalcino (SI), Tuscany
San Giovanni di Duino, in the municipality of Duino-Aurisina (TS), Friuli-Venezia Giulia
San Giovanni di Sinis, in the municipality of Cabras (OR), Sardinia
San Giovanni di Val d'Era, in the municipality of Lajatico (PI), Tuscany
San Giovanni Montebello, in the municipality of Giarre (CT), Sicily

Malta
San Ġwann (it: San Giovanni), a town and local council

Montenegro
Sveti Ivan (it: San Giovanni), a fortress atop a hill above the town of Kotor.

San Marino
San Giovanni sotto le Penne, a village (curazia) of the municipality of Borgo Maggiore

Churches
Many hundreds, probably even thousands, of churches are also named after the various saints hiding under the simple "Giovanni", among them:

the Basilica di San Giovanni in Laterano in Rome
the Baptistry of Battistero di San Giovanni (Florence)
San Giovanni (Siena)
San Giovanni de Butris in Umbria
San Giovanni di Dio in Florence
San Giovanni Battista, two churches in Italy and Switzerland

Other
Barons di San Giovanni, the noble house of Malta
San Giovanni-L'apocalisse (movie), a European TV film
San Giovanni (Rome Metro), an underground station in Rome
Sangiovanni, an Italian singer
, British ship formerly known as San Giovanni

See also

San (disambiguation)
Giovanni (disambiguation)
San Giovanni Battista (disambiguation)
Saint-Jean (disambiguation)
Saint John (disambiguation)
Saint Juan (disambiguation)
Sant Joan (disambiguation)
San Juan (disambiguation)
São João (disambiguation)
St. Johann (disambiguation)